Any Old Time may refer to:

 "Any Old Time (You're Lonely and Sad)", a song by The Foundations
 Any Old Time (album), a 1986 album by Carmen McRae
 "Any Old Time" (Artie Shaw song), a song by Artie Shaw, featuring Billie Holiday